This is a list of compositions by Lord Berners:

Opera
 Le Carrosse du Saint-Sacrament (after Prosper Mérimée; 1923, prod. Paris, 1924, Théâtre des Champs-Élysées, revised 1926)

Ballet
 The Triumph of Neptune (10 tableaux; composed for Sergei Diaghilev, scenario Sacheverell Sitwell, choreography George Balanchine; 3 December 1926, Lyceum Theatre, London)
 Adagio, Variations and Hornpipe arr. for strings from 5th and 6th tableaux
Suite for orchestra
 Luna Park (1930; scenario Boris Kochno, choreography George Balanchine, C. B. Cochran's Revue, Palace Theatre, London)
 A Wedding Bouquet (1937; scenario Gertrude Stein, choreography Frederick Ashton; costumes and scenery by Berners himself; 27 April 1937, London, Sadler's Wells Theatre)
 Cupid and Psyche (1938; stage setting Sir Francis Rose, choreography Frederick Ashton, 27 April 1939, Sadler's Wells)
 Les Sirènes (1946; designs by Cecil Beaton; Royal Opera House; the orchestration was entirely the work of Roy Douglas, who was sworn to secrecy)<ref>Mark Amory, Lord Berners: The Last Eccentric, 1998, Ch. XVII 'Peace'</ref>

Film scores
 The Halfway House (1944)
 Champagne Charlie (1945, 2 songs)
 Nicholas Nickleby (1947)

Orchestral
 Trois Morceaux (1916)
 Chinoiserie Valse sentimentale Kasatchok Fantaisie espagnole (1918–19)
 Prelude
 Fandango
 Pasadoble
 Fugue in C minor (1924)
 Adagio, Variations and Hornpipe (arranged for strings from The Triumph of Neptune, 1926)
 Suite (from The Triumph of Neptune)

Piano
 Le Poisson d'or (1914; dedicated to Igor Stravinsky)
 Trois Petites marches funèbres (1914; first performed by Alfredo Casella)
 Pour un homme d'état Pour un canari Pour une tante à héritage Fragments psychologiques (1915)
 La Haine Le Rire Un Soupir Valses bourgeoises (1917, piano duet; performed at the 1923 Salzburg Festival)
 Valse brillante Valse caprice Strauss, Strauss et Straus [sic]

Songs
 Lieder Album'' (Heinrich Heine, 1913)
 "Du bist wie eine Blume" (addressed to a small white pig)
 "König Wiswamitra"
 "Weihnachtslied"
 "Trois Chansons" (Georges Jean-Aubry, 1920)
 "Romance"
 "L'Étoile filante"
 "La Fiancée du timbalier"
 Three Songs (1920)
 "Lullaby" (Thomas Dekker)
 "The Lady Visitor in the Pauper Ward" (Robert Graves)
 "The Green-Eyed Monster" (E. L. Duff)
 "Dialogue Between Tom Filuter and his Man, by Ned the Dog-Stealer" (1921)
 Three Songs (1922)
 "The Rio Grande" (Captain Chanty)
 "Theodore, or the Pirate King" (John Masefield)
 "A Long Time Ago" (Halliards Chanty)

References
Notes

Lists of compositions by composer